Paul Davis (born 1964) is the former pitching coach for the Seattle Mariners of Major League Baseball (MLB); he served in that role during the 2019 season, before being reassigned as Chief Pitching Strategist in October 2019. He is currently the minor league pitching coordinator for the Atlanta Braves. He previously worked for the St. Louis Cardinals (2013-18) in a variety of roles, most recently as manager of pitching analytics in 2018.

Career
Davis was head coach at Dana College from 1995 to 1999, where he was twice named Nebraska-Iowa Athletic Conference coach of the year. He was the pitching coach for the Johnson City Cardinals in 2013 and 2014 before becoming the Cardinals Assistant Minor League Pitching Coordinator in 2016 and 2017.

He played high school baseball at Osceola High School in Kissimmee, Florida and college ball at Valencia Community College and Creighton University.

References

1964 births
Living people
Baseball coaches from Nebraska
Baseball players from Nebraska
Creighton Bluejays baseball players
Dana Vikings baseball coaches
Iowa Western Reivers baseball coaches
Major League Baseball pitching coaches
Minor league baseball coaches
Nebraska Cornhuskers baseball coaches
Nebraska Wesleyan Prairie Wolves coaches
Seattle Mariners coaches
Valencia Matadors baseball players